West is a cardinal direction or compass point.

West or The West may also refer to:

Geography and locations

Global context
 The Western world
 Western culture and Western civilization in general
 The Western Bloc, countries allied with NATO during the Cold War
 The Occident, an early-modern term originated with geographical divisions mirroring the cultural divide between the Hellenistic east and Latin West, and the political divide between the Western and Eastern Roman empires

Regional contexts
 West River (disambiguation)
 The American frontier, also called "The Old West" or "The Wild West", an American process of westward movement from 1600 to 1920
 The Western Regions, a historical term for regions of Chinese suzerainty in Central Asia
 Western Territories (Ziemie Zachodnie) or Recovered Territories (Ziemie Odzyskane), Former eastern territories of Germany annexed to Poland
 West (Cornish hundred) or West Wivelshire, a county subdivision of Cornwall, England
 West (London sub region), a sub-region of the London Plan
 West Region (Cameroon)
 West, Mississippi, United States
 West, Texas, United States
 West, West Virginia, United States
 Western United States, a region in the United States of America
 Western Australia
 West Bengal
 Western Canada
 Canada West
 West Scotland (Scottish Parliament electoral region)

Astronomical locations
Comet West, a comet discovered by Danish astronomer Richard M. West
2022 West, an asteroid

Acronyms
Wales Evangelical School of Theology
Western European Summer Time
Weinstein Enhanced Sensory Test, a monofilament esthesiometer
Western European Satellite Triangulation subcommittee of IAG
WEST, Tungsten (W) Environment in Steady-state Tokamak, the name for the refitted Tore Supra tokamak reactor in Cadarache, France

People and fictional characters
 West (name), list of people with surname West
 Justice West (disambiguation)
 West Rosen, a fictional character from the television series Heroes

Film, television, and radio
 West (2007 film), a 2007 Australian drama directed by Daniel Krige
 West (2013 film), a German drama film directed by Christian Schwochow
 The West (1938 film), a 1938 French drama film
 The West (miniseries), a 1996 television documentary miniseries directed by Stephen Ives
 West (TV series), a 1973–74 Canadian documentary series
 WEST (AM), a radio station (1400 AM) licensed to Easton, Pennsylvania, United States

Print media
 West (publisher), an American publisher
 "West" (short story), a story by Orson Scott Card
 The West (Mayakovsky), a 1922–1924 poetry cycle by Vladimir Mayakovsky
 West magazine, published in two separate periods by the Los Angeles Times (and otherwise known as the Los Angeles Times Magazine)
 San Jose Mercury News West Magazine or West, a Sunday magazine that succeeded the L.A. Times' West magazine
 The West Australian, a newspaper

Music
 West (EP), an album by Ego Likeness
 West (Lucinda Williams album), 2007
 West (Mark Eitzel album)
 The West (album), an album by Matmos
 "West" (song), a rock song by The Alice Rose
 "West" (Lucinda Williams song), a 2007 song off the eponymous Lucinda Williams album West (Lucinda Williams album)
 "West", a 2001 song by rock duo Pinback from their album Blue Screen Life
 "The West" (song), a 1999 Matmost song off the eponymous album The West (album)

Organizations
 West (brewery), a microbrewery in Glasgow, Scotland
 West Corporation, formerly West TeleServices
 West Hartlepool R.F.C. or simply West, a rugby football club
 West Race Cars, an American-Australian racing car manufacturer
 West High School (disambiguation)

Other uses
 West (cigarette), a tobacco brand
 Toronto West Detention Centre, a maximum security remand facility
 Kingdom of the West, a region within the Society for Creative Anachronism
 One side in the East–West Shrine Game

See also 

 
 Westlife, an Irish band
 Western (disambiguation)
 Wests (disambiguation)
 Ouest (department), Haiti
 Ouest (disambiguation), French for West
 Oeste Subregion, Portugal
 Oeste (disambiguation), Portuguese and Spanish for West